Zapopan Air Force Base (Spanish: Base Aérea Militar de Zapopan)  is a military airport located in Zapopan in the Mexican state of Jalisco.

Facilities and squads 

It has a main 945,000 sq ft aviation platform and a secondary 272,326 sq ft platform. It has also three runways: 9,842x197 ft, 8.858x148 ft and 3,937x98 ft, as well 7 hangars, control tower and various military installations.

This military airport is used by 105th Air Squad operating Cessna 182 aircraft, it is used also by 111th Air Squad operating Bell 212 and by Air College Training Squads operating Boeing-Stearman Model 75, Pilatus PC-7, Aermacchi SF-260 and Grob G 120TP aircraft.

Military Schools 
Colegio del Aire / Air College
Escuela Militar de Aviación (E.M.A.) / Military Aviation School
Escuela Militar de Mantenimiento y Abastecimiento (E.M.M.A.) / Military School of Maintenance and Supply
Escuela Militar de Especialistas de Fuerza Aérea (E.M.E.F.A.) / Military School of Air Force Specialists

References

External links 
SEDENA
Airports in Jalisco
Air Bases in Mexico
MMZP

Gallery 

Airports in Jalisco
Mexican Air Force